is a passenger railway station located in the city of Ōtsu, Shiga Prefecture, Japan, operated by the private railway company Keihan Electric Railway.

Lines

Station layout
The station consists of two opposed unnumbered side platforms connected by a level crossing. The station is unattended.

Platforms

Adjacent stations

History
Ōtani Station was opened on August 18, 1879 as a station on the Japanese Government Railways (JGR) Tōkaidō Main Line. The Keitsu Electric Railway (the predecessor to the Keihan Electric Railway) connected to the station on August 15, 1912. Due to a change in the routing of the tracks the JGR portion of the station was discontinued in 1921.

Past line

Passenger statistics
In fiscal 2018, the station was used by an average of 189 passengers daily (boarding passengers only).

Surrounding area
 Semimaru Shrine
 Japan National Route 1

See also
List of railway stations in Japan

References

External links

Keihan official home page

Railway stations in Shiga Prefecture
Stations of Keihan Electric Railway
Railway stations in Japan opened in 1912
Railway stations in Ōtsu